The Port of Lancaster was located at the lowest crossing point on the River Lune and constitutes the central element of maritime Lancaster in north-west England. It dates back to Roman times, but is now based at Glasson Dock.

History

Early origins
The port dates back to Roman times: Lancaster Roman Fort was established around 80 A.D. and the local legend of a Roman harbour is supported by the suggestion that the garrison would have been supplied more efficiently by ship than by road. However evidence of a port here is scant for both the Roman period and the subsequent Viking settlement in Lancaster.

Medieval development
When Lancaster received its charter as a borough in 1193, this recognised the development of the town. It was in 1297 that Lancaster was recorded as a port along with Cartmel and Workington and Ravenglass.

Early modern period

References

Ports and harbours of Lancashire
Buildings and structures in Lancaster, Lancashire
Ports and harbours of the Irish Sea